The Owensboro Bridge is a continuous truss bridge that spans the Ohio River between Owensboro, Kentucky and Spencer County, Indiana. Dedicated to the memory of the late U.S. Congressman Glover H. Cary (1885–1936) and often called the "Glover Cary Bridge," the bridge opened to traffic in September 1940. It originally was a toll bridge, but tolls were discontinued in 1954.

Color
In anticipation of a repainting of the bridge initially scheduled for 2006 (the previous repainting was in 1987), the local city beautification group PRIDE of Owensboro-Daviess County (Public Responsibility In Designing our Environment) sponsored an August 2003 straw poll to help determine what color to paint the bridge. PRIDE gave participants a choice of "blue," "teal," "brick red," or "green" – or participants could "write in" their own preferences.  Of the 8,245 participants in the poll, 44 percent preferred to keep the bridge its current blue (the bridge was originally silver until the 1970s). A majority of participants – 56% – preferred that the bridge be painted a different color, with 20 percent opting for teal, 18 percent for brick red, 12 percent for green, and 6 percent suggesting various "write-in" colors.

Subsequently, Kentucky and Indiana highway officials indicated the bridge was scheduled for its next repainting in about 2017 (which happens to be Owensboro's bicentennial) at an estimated cost of $17 million. The repainting was rescheduled to begin in the spring of 2013.

See also
 
 
 
 
 List of crossings of the Ohio River

References

Buildings and structures in Owensboro, Kentucky
Bridges completed in 1940
Bridges over the Ohio River
Transportation buildings and structures in Spencer County, Indiana
Road bridges in Indiana
Road bridges in Kentucky
Former toll bridges in Indiana
Former toll bridges in Kentucky
U.S. Route 231
U.S. Route 431
Steel bridges in the United States
Transportation in Daviess County, Kentucky
1940 establishments in Kentucky
1940 establishments in Indiana